Sex Rehab with Dr. Drew is a VH1 reality television show that documents people being treated for sexual addiction by Dr. Drew Pinsky and his staff at the Pasadena Recovery Center in Pasadena, California. Premiering on November 1, 2009, Sex Rehab was a spin-off of Celebrity Rehab with Dr. Drew, in which Pinsky treats celebrities for substance abuse.

Premise
Sex Rehab with Dr. Drew is a spinoff of Celebrity Rehab, in which celebrities who have substance addictions deal with their illness.  Unlike its predecessor, this show specifically addresses sexual addiction.  The participants live in a facility for 21 days with Dr. Drew Pinsky and Jill Vermeire providing daily one-on-one and group therapy sessions in order to address the psychological and psychiatric roots of their compulsive behavior.

Cast

Staff
Drew Pinsky - Pinsky is the star of the show, and the lead specialist who treats the patients. A board-certified internist and addiction medicine specialist, he rose to fame as the host of the nationally syndicated radio talk show, Loveline, and star of Celebrity Rehab with Dr. Drew, of which Sex Rehab is a spinoff.
Jill Vermeire, MFT - A sex addiction therapist. She is a licensed Marriage and Family Therapist (MFC #41255) who received her Masters in Clinical Psychology at Pepperdine University.
Selma - Lead Technician. She was fired in Episode 6 following an altercation between her and patient Kari Ann Peniche.
Louis - Resident Technician.
John Sealy - A psychiatrist who appears in two episodes for one-on-one sessions with Kari Ann and Duncan. According to cast member Duncan Roy, he also acts as a consultant for the production.
Shelly Sprague - An alumna of Celebrity Rehab with Dr. Drew, Shelly is a Resident Technician who runs the floor, and a recovering addict herself. She met Pinsky through Bob Forrest, a fellow recovering addict and colleague of Drew's with whom Sprague used to do drugs. She runs a center at Las Encinas Hospital in Pasadena, California. Nicknamed "The Shark", she arrives in Episode 6 to replace Selma.

Patients
Jennifer Ketcham – porn actress (Penny Flame)/director/businesswoman
James Lovett – Surfer/wakeboarder
Nicole Narain – Model/Playboy Playmate
Kari Ann Peniche – Beauty queen/model /fashion designer
Kendra Jade Rossi – Ex-porn star/music manager
Duncan Roy - Producer/writer/director
Amber Smith – Model/reality TV star/actress
Phil Varone – Musician/comedian

Production
Patient Kari Ann Peniche's aggressive and erratic behavior marred her participation in the treatment program. She would verbally abuse the staff and other patients, refuse to participate in group discussions or obey rules, and voice various bizarre or paranoid ideations, such as  people laughing at her when they apparently were not, and smiling uncontrollably even when angry or discussing very sad topics. Dr. Pinsky became suspicious that she was using illicit substances, or had been prior to being admitted, and the staff psychiatrist diagnosed her as having Borderline Personality Disorder, both of which require treatment before any treatment can be done for sexual addiction.  She was eventually discharged involuntarily for failing to obey the rules. Pinsky offered her an alternative program at a psychiatric hospital nearby, but she angrily refused.

Criticism
Drew Pinsky, producer John Irwin and Irwin Entertainment, which produce the show, have been criticized by addiction specialists in regard to Celebrity Rehab, from which Sex Rehab was spun off, for allegedly poor treatment techniques. With respect to Sex Rehab in particular, alumnus Duncan Roy has criticized the show's producers for prioritizing titillation and drama over rehabilitation for the patients in terms of casting, filming tactics and their editing choices, claiming that they instigated the behavior that resulted in Kari Ann Peniche's expulsion from the program in order to create a more watchable program. Roy has also questioned Pinsky's competence, saying that Jill Vermeire and Dr. John Sealy were his true source of therapeutic insight, and that while Pinsky is adept at treating drug and alcohol addiction, he is not knowledgeable in sex addiction, and merely repeated Vermeire's ideas. Roy further alleged that Sealy, whom Roy perceived as genuinely interested in helping sex addicts, confided in him that the producers had other motivations, and kept his involvement in the show minimal because he was not telegenic enough.

Episodes

After filming
Duncan Roy moved from his Malibu, California estate to a small Hollywood apartment, where he is co-star Jennifer Ketcham's neighbor.

Kari Ann Peniche appeared on the third season of Celebrity Rehab, during which it was confirmed that when entering the unit in Sex Rehab, she had smuggled speed in a teddy bear.

Peniche, Rossi and Ketcham later appeared on the second season of Sober House.

Ketcham, along with Pinsky, discussed her path into porn and her addictions to both sex and drugs, as well as her recovery, in a March 17, 2010 appearance on The View. She explained that she had taken a vow of abstinence for a year when she completed treatment, but that after nine months, she met a man with whom she was in a committed monogamous relationship, and who supported her recovery by attending meetings with her.

See also
Celebrity Rehab with Dr. Drew
Celebrity Rehab Presents Sober House

References

External links

2000s American reality television series
2009 American television series debuts
2009 American television series endings
English-language television shows
American television spin-offs
VH1 original programming